American Love is a 2016 album by Jake Owen, and its title track.

American Love may also refer to:

American Love (film), a 1931 French film
An American Love, a 1994 Italian film
American Love, a 2013 album by Bad Rabbits
"American Love", a song by Haste the Day from Burning Bridges
"American Love", a song by Jack's Mannequin from The Glass Passenger
"American Love", a song by Rose Laurens
"American Love", a song by Espen Lind (also known as Sway)
"American Love", a song by Nothingface from Violence
"American Love", a song by Smallpools from Lovetap!